This is a list of seasons completed by the Wake Forest Demon Deacons men's college basketball team.

Seasons

References

 
Wake Forest Demon Deacons
Wake Forest Demon Deacons basketball seasons